Soulfly is an American heavy metal band.

Soulfly may also refer to:
 Soulfly (Soulfly album), 1998
 SoulFly (Rod Wave album), 2021